Rodolphe Meyer de Schauensee (January 4, 1901 – April 24, 1984) was an American ornithologist.

He was born in Rome, Italy to a Swiss aristocratic family. His family moved to the United States in 1913. He was the curator of ornithology at the Academy of Natural Sciences in Philadelphia for nearly fifty years. He was particularly noted for his study of South American birds. He expanded the academy's collection of bird skins, taking part in collecting trips to Brazil, Thailand, Burma, southern Africa, the East Indies, and Guatemala. He wrote about the birds of South America, including the groundbreaking A Guide to the Birds of South America in 1970, and published a book on the birds of China just two weeks before his death.

De Schauensee is commemorated in the scientific names of two species of snakes, Eunectes deschauenseei and Hebius deschauenseei. He is also the namesake of the green-capped tanager (Stilpnia meyerdeschauenseei).

References

American ornithologists
1901 births
1984 deaths
20th-century American zoologists
American people of Swiss-Italian descent
Swiss expatriates in Italy
Swiss emigrants to the United States